The 12th Asian Junior Table Tennis Championships 2006 were held in Kitakyushu, Japan, from  25 to 30 July 2006. It was organised by Japan Table Tennis Association under the authority of the Asian Table Tennis Union (ATTU) and International Table Tennis Federation (ITTF).

Medal summary

Events

Medal table

See also

2006 World Junior Table Tennis Championships
Asian Table Tennis Championships
Asian Table Tennis Union

References

Asian Junior and Cadet Table Tennis Championships
Asian Junior and Cadet Table Tennis Championships
Asian Junior and Cadet Table Tennis Championships
Asian Junior and Cadet Table Tennis Championships
Table tennis competitions in Japan
International sports competitions hosted by Japan
Asian Junior and Cadet Table Tennis Championships